Wilbur Dyer (April 6, 1907 – January 22, 1985)
was a Democrat from Cheneyville, Louisiana, who served from 1974 to 1980 in the Louisiana House of Representatives.

Dyer won a special election to succeed Robert J. Munson, after he resigned from office in September 1973. Dyer held the seat until 1980, when Charles W. DeWitt, Jr. was elected.

Dyer and his wife, the former Burma Harris, had three children. Dyer died at the age of 77. He is interred along with his wife and son at Alexandria Memorial Gardens in Alexandria.

References

1907 births
1985 deaths
Democratic Party members of the Louisiana House of Representatives
People from Cheneyville, Louisiana
Burials in Louisiana
20th-century American politicians